Art 'n' Zoot (subtitled Their Only Concert Together) is a live album by saxophonists Art Pepper and Zoot Sims recorded in 1981 at Royce Hall in Los Angeles and released on the Pablo label in 1995.

Reception

The AllMusic review by Scott Yanow stated " it is a joy to hear this rare encounter by the two great saxophonists. It is only a pity that Pepper and Sims did not record together more extensively during their careers".

Track listing 
 "Wee (Allen's Alley)" (Denzil Best) - 7:39
 "Over the Rainbow" (Harold Arlen, Yip Harburg) - 10:28
 "In the Middle of a Kiss" (Sam Coslow) - 8:51
 "Broadway" (Wilbur H Bird, Teddy McRae, Henri Woode) - 6:29
 "The Girl from Ipanema" (Antônio Carlos Jobim, Vinícius de Moraes, Norman Gimbel) - 10:31
 "Breakdown Blues" (Art Pepper, Zoot Sims) - 10:01

Personnel 
Art Pepper - alto saxophone (tracks 1, 2 & 6)
Zoot Sims - tenor saxophone (tracks 1 & 3-6) 
Victor Feldman - piano
Barney Kessel - guitar (tracks 4 & 5) 
Ray Brown (tracks 1 & 3-6), Charlie Haden (track 2) - bass 
Billy Higgins - drums

References 

Art Pepper live albums
Zoot Sims live albums
1995 live albums
Pablo Records live albums